Hearst Island is an ice-covered, dome-shaped island lying  east of Cape Rymill, in the Weddell Sea, off the eastern coast of Palmer Land.

It was first sighted on a flight on December 20, 1928, by Sir Hubert Wilkins. Thinking it was part of the mainland of Antarctica, he named it Hearst Land, for William Randolph Hearst who helped finance the expedition. It was resighted and its insularity ascertained in 1940 by members of the USAS who explored this coast by land and from the air. They named it Wilkins Island. Examination of aerial photographs have shown, however, that this large island is what Wilkins considered Hearst Land.

See also 
 Composite Antarctic Gazetteer
 List of Antarctic and sub-Antarctic islands
 List of Antarctic islands south of 60° S 
 SCAR
 Territorial claims in Antarctica

References

External links 
 Merriam-Webster's Online Geographical Dictionary
Portal
Geographical Dictionary

Islands of Palmer Land
Islands of Magallanes Region